East Goscote Hundred was a hundred of Leicestershire, that arose from the division of the ancient Goscote hundred (also known as a Wapentake) into two.  It covered the eastern part of today's Charnwood district, along with the northern part of Harborough District, and extended south-east to meet Rutland.

The hundred was created by the sub-division of the Goscote hundred in 1346.  A parish in the East Goscote Hundred was Prestwould (later named Prestwold).

Today, the name of the East Goscote Hundred lives on in the 20th century village of East Goscote.

References

External links
Map of East Goscote

Ancient subdivisions of Leicestershire
Borough of Charnwood
Harborough District